Trametes hirsuta, commonly known as hairy bracket, is a fungal plant pathogen. It is found on dead wood of deciduous trees, especially beechwood. It is found all year round and persists due to its leathery nature.

The cap is whitish gray, with short hairs, sometimes yellowish and tomentose at the edge, and with subtle zoning. The flesh is tough with a soft gray upper layer and a whitish lower layer, separated by a black plane.

Similar species include T. pubescens, which is unzoned, buff in colour, and without layered flesh. T. versicolor is more distinctively zoned.

Biotechnology
Lyophilized cell cultures of Trametes hirsuta yield aldehydes from alkenes, representing a biotransformation alternative to ozonolysis.

See also
List of Trametes species

References

Fungi described in 1791
Fungal tree pathogens and diseases
Polyporaceae
Fungi of Europe
Taxa named by Franz Xaver von Wulfen